Zombi may refer to:

 Zombi (film) or Dawn of the Dead, a 1978 film by George Romero
 Zombi 2, a 1979 film by Lucio Fulci
 Zombi (film series), a set of horror films
 Zombi (band), a space rock band from Pittsburgh
 "Zombi", a song by P-MODEL from the album Perspective
 Zombi (1986 video game), a computer game published in 1986 by Ubisoft
 ZombiU, a video game first published in 2012 by Ubisoft, also released under the title Zombi
 Zombi (African god), a snake-deity in Voodoo cults of West Africa and Haiti

See also
 Zombie (disambiguation)